The Canon of Kings was a dated list of kings used by ancient astronomers as a convenient means to date astronomical phenomena, such as eclipses. The Canon was preserved by the astronomer Claudius Ptolemy, and is thus known sometimes as Ptolemy's Canon.  It is one of the most important bases for our knowledge of ancient chronology.

The Canon derives originally from Babylonian sources. Thus, it lists Kings of Babylon from 747 BC until the conquest of Babylon by Achaemenid Persians in 539 BC, and then Persian kings from 538 to 332 BC. At this point, the Canon was continued by Greek astronomers in Alexandria, and lists the Macedonian kings from 331 to 305 BC, the Ptolemies from 304 BC to 30 BC, and the Roman and Byzantine Emperors, although they are not kings; in some manuscripts the list is continued down to the Fall of Constantinople in 1453.

The Canon only increments by whole years, specifically the ancient Egyptian year of 365 days. This has two consequences. The first is that the dates for when monarchs began and ended their reigns are simplified to the beginning and the ending of the ancient Egyptian year, which moves one day every four years against the Julian calendar. The second is that this list of monarchs is simplified. Monarchs who reigned for less than one year are not listed, and only one monarch is listed in any year with multiple monarchs. Usually, the overlapping year is assigned to the monarch who died in that year, but not always. Note that the two periods in the Babylonian section where no king is listed the first represents two pretenders whose legitimacy the compiler did not recognize, and the second extends from the year Babylon was sacked by Sennacherib, King of Assyria to the restoration of Esarhaddon.

The Canon is generally considered by historians to be accurate, and forms part of the backbone of the commonly accepted chronology from 747 BC forward that all other datings are synchronized to. It is not, however, the ultimate source for this chronology; most of the names and lengths of reigns can be independently verified from archaeological material (coinage, annals, inscriptions in stone etc.) and extant works of history from the historical ages concerned.

Babylonian Kings, 747–539 BC
Nabonassar (Nabonassáros): 747–734 BC
Nabu-nadin-zeri (Nadíos): 733–732 BC
Nabu-mukin-zeri (Khinzêr) and Pulu (Póros): 731–727 BC
Ululas (Iloulaíos): 726–722 BC
Marduk-apla-iddina II (Mardokempádos): 721–710 BC
Sargon II (Arkeanós): 709–705 BC
no kings: 704–703 BC
Bel-ibni (Bilíbos): 702–700 BC
Ashur-nadin-shumi (Aparanadíos): 699–694 BC
Nergal-ushezib (Rhegebélos): 693 BC
Mushezib-Marduk (Mesêsimordákos): 692–689 BC
no kings: 688–681 BC
Esarhaddon (Asaradínos): 680–668 BC
Shamash-shum-ukin (Saosdoukhínos): 667–648 BC
Kandalanu (Kinêladános): 647–626 BC
Nabopolassar (Nabopolassáros): 625–605 BC
Nebuchadrezzar II (Nabokolassáros): 604–562 BC
Amel-Marduk (Illoaroudámos): 561–560 BC
Neriglissar (Nêrigasolassáros): 559–556 BC
Nabonidus (Nabonadíos): 555–539 BC

Persian Kings, 538–332 BC
Cyrus: 538–530 BC
Cambyses: 529–522 BC
Darius I: 521–486 BC
Xerxes I: 485–465 BC
Artaxerxes I: 464–424 BC
Darius II: 423–405 BC
Artaxerxes II: 404–359 BC
Artaxerxes III (Ochus): 358–338 BC
Arses (Arogus): 337–336 BC
Darius III: 335–332 BC

Macedonian Kings, 331–305 BC
Alexander the Great: 331–324 BC
Philip III: 323–317 BC
Alexander IV: 316–305 BC

Ptolemies of Egypt, 304–30 BC
Ptolemy I Soter (Ptolemy, son of Lagus): 304–285 BC
Ptolemy II Philadelphus: 284–247 BC
Ptolemy III Euergetes: 246–222 BC
Ptolemy IV Philopator: 221–205 BC
Ptolemy V Epiphanes: 204–181 BC
Ptolemy VI Philometor: 180–146 BC
Ptolemy VIII Euergetes II: 145–117 BC
Ptolemy IX Soter II: 116–81 BC
Ptolemy XII Neos Dionysus: 80–52 BC
Cleopatra Thea Philopator: 51–30 BC

Roman Emperors, 29 BC–160 AD
Augustus: 29 BC–14 AD
Tiberius: 15–36
Gaius: 37–40
Claudius: 41–54
Nero: 55–68
Vespasian: 69–78
Titus: 79–81
Domitian: 82–96
Nerva: 97
Trajan: 98–116
Hadrian: 117–137
Aelius Antoninus: 138–160

Notes and sources
Notes

References

Sources
 Reprint of the Canon in  At the Internet Archive.

See also
List of lists of ancient kings
Mesopotamia in Classical literature
Chronology of the ancient Near East

External links
Explanation of Ptolemy's Canon

Ptolemy
King lists
Astronomy timelines